Global macro is an investment strategy based on the interpretation and prediction of large-scale events related to national economies, history, and international relations. The strategy typically employs forecasts and analysis of interest rate trends, international trade and payments, political changes, government policies, inter-government relations, and other broad systemic factors.

Other definitions
A noted example of what is now called a Global Macro strategy was George Soros' profitable sale of the pound sterling in 1992 prior to the European Rate Mechanism debacle.

In the 2010 Opalesque Roundtable discussion of global macro, hedge fund manager John Burbank discussed the increasing importance and shift of private and institutional investors toward more global macro strategies. Burbank defined global macro as "having a reason to be long or short something that is bigger than a fundamental stock view". DoubleLine has characterized macro as a "go anywhere, do anything" strategy, highlighting the relatively free mandate of the strategy. In reality, investors typically expect macro managers to express views within their field of expertise.

Global macro trading
Global macro trading strategies are based on educated guesses about the macroeconomic developments of the world. Mike Novogratz, former president of Fortress Investment Group, runs a global investment management firm with total assets under management of approximately $41.6 billion and $4.3 billion in a global macro hedge fund in 2015 discussed global macro trading in his video interview. Novogratz described global macro strategies as monitoring these macroeconomic stories, such as global imbalances, business cycles, the survival of the Euro, and changing growth models of emerging economies. He says that there is an inherent difference between global macro fund managers and traditional equity managers. Most long/short equity managers started in research as analysts and look to follow these macroeconomic stories based on what positions they believe in and stock positions they rely on.

On the other hand, global macro traders and managers focus primarily on the risk side of trading. For macro traders and managers, the primary element in decision-making is risk, because when investing in such a speculative world there are so many risk factors and moving data points that they must take into account. Macro traders are not fundamentalists; they rely on risk management and staying liquid to avoid a liquidity crisis. In 2007 and 2008, with the credit bubble where there was a long period of high volatility and illiquidity, many global macro funds found themselves with liquidity problems.

Types of the strategy
Neil Azous, the Founder and Chief Investment Officer of Rareview Capital LLC, explains that Global Macro Trading is grouped into three strategies: Discretionary, Commodity Trading Advisor (CTA)/Managed Futures, and Systematic. As noted by Azous: 
 
 Discretionary Macro execute their strategies by deploying directional positions at the asset class level to express a positive or negative top-down view on a market. Of all of the strategies, discretionary macro provides the most flexibility, including the ability to express either long or short views, across any asset class, and in any region.
 CTA/Managed Futures use products very similar to those that discretionary macro managers trade. However, the methodology in which they arrive at those long or short positions is very different. CTAs typically apply priced-based trend-following algorithms to the trading of futures contracts.
 Systematic Macro is a hybrid between discretionary macro and CTA/managed futures. The signals that are used to enter into positions are based upon fundamental analysis, similar to discretionary macro, but the deployment of those trades is based on a systematic, or model-driven process, as is the case with CTAs.

Most managers tend to use a hybrid approach. While discretionary managers are using fundamental data to take positions, they also typically deploy technical rules, such as a "stop-loss" to reduce risk. CTAs tend to have discretionary research and idea generation and commonly mixes non-price data into their framework. The above classification framework is not exhaustive, but a simplified classification strategy.

References

External links
Introduction to Global Macro Hedge Funds
Global Macro Index 
Discretionary CTA/Global Macro Index
Global Macro Trading

Investment management
Hedge funds